A leadership election for the Civic Democratic Party (ODS)  was held on 29 November in Kopřivnice. Václav Klaus was reelected as party's leader. He received 220 votes while 48 delegates voted against him. Klaus's victory was considered certain. Václav Benda had a speech during the election in which he criticised Klaus' politics. Election was marked by technical problems. After voting was finished, it was found out that there were 5 more votes than delegates. Election was then repeated.

References

1993
1993 elections in the Czech Republic
Single-candidate elections
Civic Democratic Party leadership election